Aperam S.A. is a Belgian-French company, listed on the Amsterdam, Brussels, Paris, Madrid and Luxembourg stock exchanges and with facilities in Brazil, Belgium and France, which concentrates on the production of stainless steel and speciality steel.  It was spun out of ArcelorMittal at the start of 2011; the facilities that became Aperam had about 27% by turnover of the stainless-steel market as of 2009.

The Brazilian facility uses charcoal from a series of eucalyptus forests owned and managed by the group rather than coking coal to reduce the material; the European facilities use electric-arc furnaces fed with scrap.  The use of charcoal reduces the  footprint of the facility.

Corporate history 
The Brazilian facilities of Aperam mostly correspond to Aperam South America (old Acesita), which was privatised by the Brazilian government in 1992 and purchased by Usinor in 1998.

Usinor merged with Arbed and Aceralia to become Arcelor in 2001, and Aperam became a wholly owned subsidiary of ArcelorMittal in 2007 in the hostile takeover of state-owned enterprise Arcelor by Lakshmi Mittal.

As of June 2021, 40.83% of Aperam is owned by the Lakshmi Mittal family.

See also
 List of steel producers

References 

Steel companies of Luxembourg
Companies listed on Euronext Amsterdam
Mittal family